Texas Tech University School of Music is the music school at Texas Tech University in Lubbock, Texas. Previously a department of the College of Arts & Sciences, the School of Music has been within the Talkington College of Visual & Performing Arts since the college's founding in 2004.

Facilities

Notable people

Alumni

Faculty
Faculty Directory

See also
 Texas Tech University Goin' Band from Raiderland
 Vernacular Music Center

References

External links
 

Music
Music education in the United States
Music schools in Texas
Texas classical music
Performing arts education in the United States